Eleonora Cassano (born January 5, 1965 in Boedo, Buenos Aires) is an Argentine ballet dancer and teacher. She is known for being the dancing partner of Julio Bocca since 1989.

Cassano studied in the Teatro Colón's Advanced Arts Institute and begins to work in the Teresa Carreño Foundation of Venezuela. In 1996, she started her career in the musical theatre with the plays La Cassano en el Maipo and Cassano dancing. Over the following years she would continue dancing in other musicals such as La Duarte, where she played as Evita and Cinderella Tango Club.

In the year 2000 she participated in the international Millennium Day event, dancing in Ushuaia with Bocca and the Ballet Argentino in a performance broadcast to the whole world.

She also participated as a guest judge on 2012 in the reality dance competition Bailando por un Sueño in "ShowMatch", hosted by Marcelo Tinelli.

References

External links
Sitio oficial 
Eleonora Cassano interview 
La Duarte at the Maipo Theatre 
La ficha: Eleonora Cassano, Page 12, 2006
Eleonora Cassano: entre mi propia historia y la de Cenicienta hay un vínculo, Page 12, 2006

1965 births
Living people
People from Buenos Aires
Argentine people of Italian descent
Argentine people of Spanish descent
Prima ballerinas
Dance teachers
Ballet teachers
Argentine ballerinas
Participants in Argentine reality television series
Bailando por un Sueño (Argentine TV series) participants